The 2022–23 BNXT League is the second season of the BNXT League, the highest professional basketball league in Belgium and the Netherlands. ZZ Leiden is the defending champion.

The season will begin on 30 September 2022.

Competition formula
The league will consist of different stages with national championships and a common BeNeLeague championship.

Teams 
On 20 June 2022, the league announced 20 teams obtained a club license. The Hague Royals were not granted a license.

Phoenix Brussels changed their name to Circus Brussels Basketball after they signed a new sponsorship deal.

Arenas and locations 

 Note: Table lists in alphabetical order.

Personnel and sponsorship

Coaching changes

National Round

Netherlands

Standings

Results

Belgium

Standings

Results

International Round

Elite Gold

Standings

Results

Elite Silver

Standings

Results

References

In European competitions

External links 

 Official website

2022–23
BNXT
BNXT